My Brother the Pig is a 1999 American children's fantasy comedy film directed by Erik Fleming and written by Matthew Flynn. It stars Scarlett Johansson, Eva Mendes, Judge Reinhold, and Alex D. Linz.

Plot
A boy named George is magically transformed into a pig. In a dangerous and crazy adventure, the boy, his sister Kathy, his best friend Freud, and their housekeeper Matilda leave for Mexico to try to undo the witchcraft spell before their parents return from their Paris trip.

While gathering ingredients in order for Matilda's grandmother, Berta, to undo the spell, Kathy grows impatient and after insulting both Matilda and Berta, storms off into town, where she befriends two Mexican girls who speak English and have satellite TV. Meanwhile, Freud accidentally loses George to Edwardo, a butcher. With Kathy and her friends, they try to rescue George, in the process angering Edwardo.

They are able to get George to Coyote Mountain, under a full moon phase, where a potion has been prepared to return George back to normal. Unfortunately, Edwardo had followed them, just as the ritual had begun. Matilda and Berta dose Edwardo with the potion, turning him into a vulture, while George is restored back to normal. They soon return home and act like nothing has happened, except for the fact that George still has a pig's tail.

Cast
 Nick Fuoco as George Caldwell
 Dee Bradley Baker as the voice of Pig George
 Scarlett Johansson as Kathy Caldwell
 Eva Mendes as Matilda
 Alex D. Linz as Freud
 Judge Reinhold as Richard Caldwell
 Renée Victor as Grandma
 Marco Rodríguez as Edwardo
 Romy Walthall as Dee Dee Caldwell
 Eduardo Garcia as Luis

Animal actors Bronco, Gloria, Patches, Piggy, Red, and Trouble portray Pig George.

Release
According to Michael A. Schuman, My Brother the Pig was given a brief theatrical run, after which it was "soon forgotten".

Reception
The Dove Foundation gave the movie its seal of approval, writing, "The adventure the kids go on with their nanny to save Kathy's brother George is filled with fun and excitement." Kim R. Holston and Warren Hope reviewed the film, calling it "mildly entertaining but strains credulity".

References

External links
 
 
 
 Review at Decider

1999 films
1999 children's films
1999 comedy films
1999 fantasy films
1990s adventure comedy films
1990s American films
1990s children's adventure films
1990s children's comedy films
1990s children's fantasy films
1990s English-language films
1990s fantasy adventure films
1990s fantasy comedy films
American adventure comedy films
American children's adventure films
American children's comedy films
American children's fantasy films
American fantasy adventure films
American fantasy comedy films
Films about pigs
Films about shapeshifting
Films about siblings
Films about witchcraft
Films scored by Michael Giacchino
Films set in California
Films set in Mexico